James D. Montgomery Sr. (born February 17, 1932 in Louise, Mississippi) is a prominent African-American attorney in Chicago and one of the Trustees for the University of Illinois.

Montgomery previously served as Corporation Counsel for the City of Chicago under Mayor Harold Washington.

References

External links
 Website bio
 

1932 births
Living people
American lawyers
University of Illinois College of Law alumni
People from Humphreys County, Mississippi